Rachael Thomas (née Harder)  (born ) is a Canadian politician who was elected to represent the riding of Lethbridge in the House of Commons of Canada in the 2015 federal election. A member of the Conservative Party, she was reelected in the 2019 and 2021 federal elections. Thomas is the current Shadow Minister for Canadian Heritage and she has served as the Official Opposition critic for Youth, Persons with Disabilities, Status of Women, and Digital Government.

Early life and career 
Harder grew up on a small horse farm in Kathyrn, Alberta, where she was the third of five children. When she was nine years old, she planned a dog kennel business with her parents. Harder engaged in humanitarian work in Mexican orphanages and African health clinics and schools. She graduated from Briercrest College and Seminary in Saskatchewan and was named its young alumnus of the year in 2012. Harder then moved back to Alberta to attend the University of Lethbridge, where she graduated with a Bachelor of Education and Bachelor of Social Sciences.

Harder worked as a youth and young adult consultant and published a paper on emerging trends for young Canadians. The report, Hemorrhaging faith: Why and when Canadian young adults are leaving, staying and returning to church was commissioned by the Evangelical Fellowship of Canada and was published in 2012 by Harder and her four co-authors. Using 72 interviews and almost 3,000 survey responses, it studied how and why younger Canadians aged 18–34 were increasingly leaving the church. A review of the report by Kelvin F. Mutter, an associate professor at McMaster Divinity College, praised it as "a sound piece of research" and "a vital resource for anyone interested in ministering with youth and young adults". Mutter also gave minor criticisms of the report for being largely limited to description and analysis instead of solutions, and not devoting more time to early childhood and family spiritual practices because of its scope being limited to young adults.

Federal politics

2015 election and 42nd Parliament 
Harder was nominated by the Conservative Party as their candidate for the riding of Lethbridge in the House of Commons of Canada for the 2015 federal election. Harder was elected with 56.8% of the popular vote. She was the first female elected to represent the Lethbridge riding (https://lethbridgecampusmedia.ca/rachael-harder-makes-history/).

The former MP for the riding, Jim Hillyer, chose to run in the adjacent riding of Medicine Hat—Cardston—Warner, which was created after the 2012 Canadian federal electoral redistribution.[6] During Harder's campaign, Harder filled out a survey from the anti-abortion Campaign Life Coalition indicating that she would work to pass laws banning abortion if elected.[7] Later, the Lethbridge Herald reported that she said that all women deserve access to abortion at a campaign town hall.[8] The Campaign Life Coalition then contacted Harder's campaign to verify their "pro-life" rating of her on the organization's website, and restored the profile, claiming that Harder's campaign manager told them that the Herald had misquoted her.[8] Harder was elected, becoming the first woman MP to represent the traditionally Conservative riding.[2][9] In November 2015, she was chosen by interim Conservative leader Rona Ambrose to serve as official opposition critic for Youth and Persons with Disabilities.[2] In Summer 2016, Harder gave nearly $12,000 of the Canada Summer Jobs Grant funds allocated to her as an MP to two Lethbridge pregnancy care centres that do not perform abortions or refer patients to abortion clinics.[8] 

During the 2017 Conservative Party leadership election, Harder endorsed Erin O'Toole, who failed to win the leadership. In August 2017, Andrew Scheer, the new Conservative leader, named Harder to his shadow cabinet as critic for the Status of Women. Anti-abortion group RightNow praised Scheer for choosing Harder for the Status of Women critic portfolio. Shortly after taking on the position, in response to media questions about her position on abortion, Harder issued a statement that she would follow the Conservative Party's official position on not re-opening the abortion issue in Canada.

On September 1, 2017, Harder, along with fellow Conservative MP Tony Clement, were banned from entering Azerbaijan because they visited the disputed region of Nagorno-Karabakh, which is occupied by Armenia as part an ongoing conflict. The trip to the region was paid for by One Free World International, a Toronto non-profit group. The executive director of the Armenian National Committee of Canada, Sevag Belian, accompanied Harder and Clement and arranged for them to meet senior government officials on their trip.

In late September 2017, Harder was nominated by fellow Conservative MPs to be the Chair of the House Status of Women Committee, which by convention is chaired by an MP from an opposition party. However, Liberal and NDP members of the committee walked out of the meeting to deny quorum during which the vote to fill the Chair position would have been held, in protest of Harder's anti-abortion voting record and her previous endorsement by the Campaign Life Coalition. The following week, on October 3, the Liberals used their majority on the committee, and also with the support of the committee's only NDP MP, Sheila Malcolmson, to instead nominate and confirm Conservative pro-choice MP Karen Vecchio as Chair over her objections. Afterwards, Vecchio, the Conservative critic for families, children and social development, and Harder issued a joint statement accusing the Liberals of politicizing the Chair selection process and of bullying Harder.

From February 2019 to August 2020, Harder was the Chair of the House Standing Committee for Access to Information, Privacy and Ethics, as well as its subcommittee on agenda and procedure. In March 2019, Harder spearheaded the creation of an inter-parliamentary friendship group between Canada and the Republic of Artsakh. From April 2019 to February 2020, Harder was a member of the executive of the Canada-Europe Parliamentary Association.

2019 election and 43rd Parliament 
In October 2019, Harder was reelected with 65.8% of the popular vote. Harder's Conservative platform for the 2019 federal election included a focus on the expansion of the energy sector, and the completion of pipelines. Her environmental positions included ending carbon pricing in Canada, and the prohibition against dumping sewage in waterways such as the West Coast and the St. Lawrence River. Harder also cited crime and the opioid crisis as a major issue to be tackled, as well as an advance of aid to local peace officers.

In November 2019, Conservative leader Andrew Scheer removed Harder from her shadow cabinet critic portfolio in a post-election shuffle. In November 2020, Harder received public criticism for sharing on Facebook a Toronto Sun column which highlighted official Alberta Health statistics which showed that up to that point only 10 people who died of COVID-19 in Alberta during the pandemic had no comorbidities. After almost a thousand comments, mostly criticizing her perceived insensitivity to the hundreds dead who had comorbidities, Harder edited her original post to add that it was important to protect the most vulnerable during a pandemic.

After Erin O'Toole, whom Harder had backed for leadership in 2017, won the 2020 Conservative leadership election to succeed Scheer as party leader, Harder returned to the shadow cabinet in the February 2021 shuffle as the critic for Digital Government.

In July 2021, Harder was one of 62 Conservative MPs to vote against a bill banning conversion therapy in Canada.

2021 election and 44th Parliament 
In September 2021, Harder was reelected with about 55% of the popular vote. In November 2021, she legally changed her name to last name to "Thomas" after her marriage earlier in the year, and began using it for her parliamentary work.

In a February 4, 2022 Toronto Sun opinion piece, Thomas expressed support for the Canada convoy protests describing protestors as "peacefully demonstrating, which is their right to do".

In the House of Commons on March 28 during the debate on the fall economic update, Thomas stated without citing a poll that "many Canadians" agreed with her view that Prime Minister Trudeau was a "dictator" despite the fact that he had just been democratically elected six months earlier. Thomas said the results of the October 2025 federal election would provide proof that Trudeau was a "dictator". She then read out loud the Oxford dictionary definition of dictator, and said this applied to Prime Minister Trudeau. Critics said that Thomas was "inflaming political discourse in Canada". Others described her comments as "crazy", "irresponsible rhetoric" and a "verbal attack". The comments came in response to a question by parliamentary secretary Mark Gerretson who asked Thomas if she agreed with the rhetoric of Brad Redekopp CPC MP Saskatoon West who spoke moments before Thomas' statement. Redekopp compared the invoking of the Emergencies Act during the Canada convoy protests with police "crushing" protesters under the "jackboot of the Prime Minister's basic dictatorship" to Putin crushing Ukraine. Liberal MP Winnipeg North Kevin Lamoureux called on members to be more cautious in their speech.

A December 21, 2021 Globe and Mail article reported that Thomas was spreading COVID-19 misinformation about variants and vaccines by asserting without evidence in her December 16 video posted to Facebook that there were more hospitalized vaccinated people than unvaccinated; that taking a daily rapid test was safer than getting vaccinated; and that vaccines did not protect against Omicron.  
University of Alberta professor Timothy Caulfield, who was interviewed for the Globe article, said that Thomas claims that her "perspective is scientifically definitive" when in reality her statements have no scientific merit. For example, in mid-December in Alberta, while only 20% were unvaccinated, they represent 67% of COVID-related hospitalizations. Caulfield is a Canada Research Chair in Health Law and Policy who has focused on the real dangers of "misinformation as one of the great challenges of our time." In the December video Thomas claimed that she and other who choose to not get vaccinated, were victims of Canadians who are not respecting their "freedom and personal choice". Caulfield said that Thomas she does not understand "rights and freedoms in a liberal democracy" and that choices "have consequences". He said that Thomas' actions were not "noble" and that her messaging caused "great harm" to Canadians by advocating that people not get vaccinated. This misinformation leads to vaccine hesitancy.

In November, then PCP leader Erin O'Toole removed Thomas and "other high-profile Conservatives", like Marilyn Gladu and Leslyn Lewis, from the post-election shadow cabinet because they openly opposed COVID-19 vaccinations during the  pandemic. O'Toole had made multiple calls for Canadians to get vaccinated.

Personal life 
In June 2021, Harder married Victor Thomas at the Banff Springs Hotel. Harder is a Christian.

Electoral record

References

External links

Official website
Hemorrhaging faith: Why and when Canadian young adults are leaving, staying and returning to church - Website for Harder's co-authored paper

1986 births
Living people
Members of the House of Commons of Canada from Alberta
Conservative Party of Canada MPs
Women members of the House of Commons of Canada
People from Lethbridge
University of Lethbridge alumni
Women in Alberta politics
21st-century Canadian politicians
21st-century Canadian women politicians